Old Town is an unincorporated community in Brunswick County, on N.C. 133.

References

Unincorporated communities in North Carolina
Unincorporated communities in Brunswick County, North Carolina